Acetate thiokinase may refer to:

 Acetate—CoA ligase (ADP-forming), an enzyme
 Acetyl-CoA synthetase (or Acetyl-CoA ligase), an enzyme